Protests at several locations in Ireland started in early November 2022 after the development of sites in various parts of the country as temporary refugee shelters by the Department of Children, Equality, Disability, Integration and Youth (DCEDIY), as it attempts to accommodate the influx of 65,000 refugees during 2022. Protests have been held in  East Wall, Ballymun, Drimnagh and elsewhere in Dublin, Fermoy and Mallow in County Cork, Kill, County Kildare, Lismore, County Waterford, and Mullingar.

The protests raised similar concerns over refugee selection discrimination and the lack of provision of prior information to residents. Protesters have questioned the lack of women and children in some accommodation centres.

The presence of anti-immigrant protesters, members of far-right groups, and violent criminals at these protests has been highlighted online and in the media. Politicians have commented on the protests including Leo Varadkar, the Taoiseach , who said vetoing immigration is "not right", and they have been raised in Seanad Éireann and a joint committee with Dáil Éireann.

Background

Protests at several locations in the north of the Republic of Ireland started in November 2018, after the organisation of temporary refugee shelters in hotels by the DCEDIY. Proposed refugee shelters were firebombed in Moville and Roosky, as was a pro-refugee politician's car in Ballinamore, and demonstrations were held in Roosky, Oughterard, Ballinamore, Carrickmacross, and Achill.

Anti-immigrant members of far-right groups were involved in some of the protests. Politicians and others took different positions on the protests, with some supporting them and others criticising them.
In February 2022, a major international refugee crisis occurred following the 2022 Russian invasion of Ukraine, with millions of Ukrainians displaced. Alongside almost all other European countries, Ireland accepted Ukrainian refugees fleeing the war; by mid-November 2022 over 58,000 Ukrainians had come to Ireland. November 2022 was also the beginning of the protests against the development of sites as temporary refugee shelters by the DCEDIY. Since the mid-2010s, Ireland has been experiencing a housing and accommodation crisis; the simultaneous overlap of both crises exacerbated each other; the failure to provide housing meant that refugees could not expect to find much accommodation in Ireland, and the arrival of thousands of refugees in Ireland meant further strains on housing and accommodation demands that were already peaking.

Dublin region

East Wall protests 

Protests started in East Wall in November 2022 over refugees arriving at an office block at the Two Gateway Building which was formerly used by the ESB Group. It was converted into an emergency accommodation centre and it is to be managed by Gateway Integration Ltd for at least 12 months starting from December 2022. After locals questioning why there was no local consultation conducted in advance, the DCEDIY cited the urgency of the situation. A leaflet was subsequently sent out to residents providing further information.

Various reasons for the protest have been cited including: the lack of prior consultation with residents about the arrivals, the potential overcrowding of children's facilities, that the building is reportedly not fit for purpose, and the lack of women and children in the initial group, though local residents have described the protests as embarrassing. However, a North African refugee reported to The Irish Mirror that there is respect for the protestors within the refugee group and that they agree with them.

The only people staying at the building  were around 100 single males who had arrived from Citywest and Athlone, or who were previously living in tents, but the DCEDIY said that the next group to move in would be families. Others have complained the government did not provide similar accommodation for people affected by the Dublin homelessness crisis.

The protests also quickly became used by far-right groups such as the National Party and Irish Freedom Party to promote their ideologies, including Euroscepticism and extreme forms of Irish nationalism. After videos of refugees arriving by bus spread online, it was used to promote racist and pro-Russian ideologies online, as well as at the protest itself, with shouts of "hang them" and chants of "get them out" directed at the refugees. Protestors and politicians have frequently mentioned that the refugees comprise Ukrainian refugees of the Russo-Ukrainian War when referencing the event, but the Department of Justice says that  it has yet to determine the status of asylum seekers in the building and would ultimately deport any non-genuine refugees. The Irish Independent said that some refugees are Afghan, Somali, and Nigerian and one refugee has identified themselves as being Afghan and had fled from the Taliban. The DCEDIY has said that they are not economic migrants, despite a claim made by the activist Ben Gilroy.

East Wall Protest Committee 
On 28 November and 5 December 2022, protesters blocked access to the Dublin Port Tunnel, leading to diversions, and a group of the protesters identifying as the "East Wall Protest Committee" have held further regular protests at the tunnel and on the East Wall Road, on Mondays, Wednesdays and Fridays . On the night of 18 December, they also blocked traffic accessing the East-Link toll bridge, Samuel Beckett Bridge and Busáras. It is led by solicitor and former Workers' Party member, Malachy Steenson, a lifelong Socialist Republican. During protests at Amiens Street, a spokesperson for the committee, Nigel Murphy, said that the protests organised by the group are not against asylum seekers in the area, but they are about "treating them suitably and giving them accommodation which is suitable." The committee has told their activists not to have any political banners as they would be "rejected by residents".  The degree of local support for and membership of the committee is unclear.

The committee paused their protests to meet with Roderic O'Gorman (the minister leading the DCEDIY), Paschal Donohoe (the Minister for Public Expenditure, National Development Plan Delivery and Reform), and another committee but Steenson said prior to the meeting that he had no intention of ceasing the protest if the centre was not closed within 7 days. Protests resumed after the meeting, blocking traffic again on 2 December. A Sunday World report also described Steenson and Hermann Kelly, leader of the Irish Freedom Party, using the protest to speak out against the provision of tampons in the male toilets of Dáil Éireann, LGBT and Ukrainian flags being flown over State buildings over the Tricolour, Sinn Féin and its leader Mary Lou McDonald, local Social Democrats TD Gary Gannon, the EU, and the "super woke".

Other parts of Dublin Inner City
On 30 January 2022, a 19th-century building on Sherrard Street in Dublin's North Inner City was set ablaze after rumours circulated locally the building was going to be used to house refugees. The Gardai began an arson investigation immediately afterwards. 
On 15 February one man was arrested after his vehicle struck one person during an anti-immigration protest in Dublin's North Inner City. The victim was taken to hospital while the driver was arrested before being charged with dangerous driving.

A protest of about 50 attendees in Cookstown, Tallaght was met by counter-protesters and there was also a counter-protest against an anti-immigration group in Clondalkin.

Kill protests 
On 6 November 2022, protests and a meeting in a local GAA club were held by a group of locals of Kill, County Kildare over an equestrian centre earmarked for development as a transitional shelter for 350 refugees. It had been sold in 2017 after a major flood in 2011, being identified as a floodplain. Kildare County Council has also said the site is unsuitable and Mayor of Kildare, Fintan Brett, supports the protests, saying there is no lighting, ventilation and possibly without a sewerage system. Concerns were also raised over lack of information, the possible lack of women and children (as there were no family units), and overcrowding, due to it increasing the local population by 10%. The protests passed without incident, but shortly after 8p.m. that day, a fire broke out in a shed in the rear of the centre and the incident was investigated by the Garda Síochána. On the morning of Sunday 20 November 2022, a protest at Leinster House and an organised motorcade protest of between 100 and 200 vehicles from Kill to Naas and back was held by Kill locals. Roderic O'Gorman held a meeting with Kill residents over the site after the two protests that day.

One week later, on 27 November, a motorcade and protest was held at the entrance. Fiona Forkan of the Kill Residents Action Group told KildareNow that she "spent three days […] trying to get a GP appointment" and said that there were fears about overcrowding for schools in the area. Forkan also says that she was told that it would only be Ukrainians being housed at the centre for a period of 12 months to three years.

Arson threat
On 12 January 2023, a former dissident Republican who previously spent 18 months in prison for membership of an organisation calling itself the IRA was arrested after he threatened to burn down a hotel in Athy, County Kildare, housing 40 refugees. The Irish Times named the man as Stephen O’Rourke and stated he is now a supporter of the National Party. Following a court appearance, O'Rourke was ordered to stay 500 metres away from the hotel and to not contact its staff or residents.

Drimnagh protests 
On 3 January 2023, a protest occurred outside Our Lady of Mercy Secondary School in Drimnagh. Between 23 December and 3 January, Ukrainian refugees stayed in the building while it was empty during the Christmas holidays. Protesters mistakenly believed the occupancy to be permanent, and that schoolchildren would be unable to return to it. The Ukrainians had already left when the protest began at 7p.m. and protesters began chanting at cleaning staff entering the building, mistaking them for Ukrainians. The protest led to one woman being arrested and charged on public order offences. Further protests occurred on the evening of 4 January, and the morning of 5 January as schoolchildren re-entered the building as planned. In the aftermath, a "Drimnagh for All" counter-group was setup by the local community.

Ballymun protests 

On 8 January 2023, there were protests outside a Travelodge hotel in Ballymun, Dublin housing 221 International Protection seekers. There were also protests at a local school where the asylum seekers were previously housed. The protests were condemned by the Lord Mayor of Dublin, Caroline Conroy, who told Today with Claire Burne that there were leaflets distributed to houses and "quite visual" banners at the protests. She also mentioned that "so much work has gone into Ballymun", mentioning public opinion about the suburb which she says seems to have been "destroyed". Protestors blocked the M50 for about an hour, as well as others blocking Ballymun Road and Santry Avenue with sulkies. Local councillors, schools, and other groups were due to have a meeting the day after. Local and former county footballer Philly McMahon called the protests "disappointing" and the Minister for Housing, Darragh O'Brien told RTÉ News that protestors have a right to protest but "do not have a right to intimidate people". The Minister for Justice also described the protests as intimidation and a spokesperson for the DCEDIY condemned the protests as well. Lucky Khambule, the co-founder of the Movement of Asylum Seekers in Ireland, told Morning Ireland that witnesses were "scared" and reported that children 12–13 years old were involved in the protest.

Ashtown attack and protest 
On 20 January 2023, a group of men arrived at a migrant camp of 15 tents on the banks of the Tolka River in Ashtown, Dublin. They brought with them four dogs, including a German Shepard and a pit bull terrier, and they shouted at the migrants to "pack up and get out now". One was armed with a baseball bat, which witnesses allege was used to attack a Polish man who had been staying there since 2022. Kitty Holland, a journalist for The Irish Times alleges to have witnesses the attack. The man told the paper that his arm had been x-rayed and that "everything is okay". The migrants since abandoned the camp. The other migrants are from Croatia, Hungary, Portugal, India, and Scotland.

Ten days after the alleged attack, around 200 local residents, trade union members, and activists held a protest outside Ashtown railway station. Former TD Ruth Coppinger said that the attack does not represent the area and said people were "appalled" after learning of what organisers described as a "racist attack". Leo Varadkar also said it has the "has the feel and look of essentially a racist attack". People with Indian and Sudanese nationalities in the area have reported that they have become worried about their safety following the reports. Karen Dempsey, attending the protest on behalf of the group Dublin 15/7 who are against gender-related violence, alleged that the rationale for the attack was that rumours were spread that the migrants were violent against women.

Finglas protests
On 1 February 2023, after renewed attempts to house refugees in a vacant factory in Finglas, Dublin, a crowd of roughly 200 people protested against immigration outside Finglas Garda station. The protest was accompanied by the Garda Public Order Unit in riot gear, who also closed 1 km of the street. Subsequently, one of the protesters, Graham Carey, was arrested by armed members of the Special Detective Unit after he posted a threat on social media that the protestors would "go through" the Garda station and made other threats of violence. Carey has been described as a local far-right activist who was previously involved in anti-vaccine and anti-lockdown protests. Organisers told protestors to bring guns and other weapons to the protests and the local branch of the Garda Representative Association called the situation "near anarchy". Protests at the Garda station were attended by gangland criminal Wayne Bradley, who was previously convicted for an attempted robbery of a cash-in-transit van with his brother Alan Bradley.

The attacks were motivated by allegations that black people or immigrants sexually assaulted a woman on Cappagh Road in the early hours of 27 January 2023, but Gardaí believe the supposed perpetrator was a white Irish male.

On 3 February 2023, Graham Carey was charged in court with incitement to hatred. He was barred from social media, ordered to stay away from centres and locations housing refugees and was subject to a curfew.

Cork region

Fermoy demonstrations 
On 29 November, videos similar to those taken in East Wall were taken by local soccer team owner Anthony Cody showing more refugees exiting a bus in Fermoy, County Cork. Smaller protests on 26 November were instigated by Derek Blighe of Ireland First (a Telegram group with just over 3,100 subscribers) and attended by 70 people in the town over housing refugees in St. Joseph's Convent and he commended the East Wall protests in his address. He claims that the 62–70 Ukrainians were not from Ukraine and that the Russo-Ukrainian War is not a war. Concerns were again raised that there were only single men refugees, but all men were part of a family group.

In response to this, up to 300 people from Fermoy held a counter-demonstration 'Rally against Racism''' organised by Fermoy and Mallow Against Racism with music and banners to show support for the refugees and to discredit the first protest. At the demonstration, local musician Mo O'Connor performed his own composition, Homeland, about Mexicans who had migrated to the United States, people in the community that run services supporting refugees gave speeches (like the local Sanctuary Runners, also available for refugees in East Wall), and local Cork politicians were there to support the event. Blighe said the counter-demonstrators from Fermoy were not from Fermoy and the counter-demonstrators similarly claim that the initial protesters are not from Fermoy and do not represent Fermoy.

The convent had been derelict for 50 years and refugees are also staying at the old Grand Hotel and in a separate church property as well.

Assault of Garda
On 19 January 2023, a video was spread of an assault of a plainclothes member of the Garda Síochána on Oliver Plunkett Hill in Fermoy. The Garda was struck in the face after being questioned by an anti-refugee protestor. Gardaí estimate the time of the assault to be at 6p.m. and have instigated an investigation.

 Mallow protests 
On 25 January 2023, after the construction of modular homes for Ukrainian refugees in Mallow, County Cork, protests were held by locals who said there was no prior consultation with them before work got underway. Councillor John Paul O'Shea of Cork County Council said on C103 that there were test operations at the site, which he said the Office of Public Works had put forward as one of the locations for refugee accommodation and would discuss it further in a private meeting. He also said that there would be consultation if the housing was completed.

Waterford region
Lismore protests

Protests against the conversion of a vacant hotel into a direct provision centre in Lismore, County Waterford occurred on 31 January 2023. 300 people protested in the street in front of the Lismore House Hotel, which had been shut since 2016, and the leaders of the protest claimed the protest was not against the housing of refugees, but against the use of the building, which was previously listed as a heritage building. Planning permission to redevelop the hotel had been sought in 2021, but for the building to be used as a nightclub and cafe. That permission was denied in January 2022. Green Party TD Marc Ó Cathasaigh admitted on local radio that there had been a failure by the government to communicate with the local community about the new plans for the building, but be that as it may, the building was now needed immediately to house 117 asylum seekers, who would be brought in on a phased basis. The first phrase would see 67 women and children brought in. Ó Cathasaigh stated, "In good conscience, I cannot stand over a situation where a hotel stands empty while people are made homeless". After the initial protests, a counter-group,  Lismore for All, was set up. A "Lismore Welcome project" group was already in existence following a 2019 attempt by far-right activists to infiltrate local meetings regarding the introduction of a Syrian refugee family into the area.

Midlands region
Mullingar protests
On 2 February 2023, approximately 300 people protested against the use of Columb Barracks in Mullingar, County Westmeath by asylum seekers. The Irish government plans to house up to 120 people in tents on the grounds of the barracks. A group called "Mullingar says No!" organised the protest and distributed leaflets claiming the barracks could be used to house 1,700 asylum seekers. Columb Barracks Restoration & Regeneration Committee, a pre-existing local organisation said they had concerns about asylum seekers using the barracks, but distanced themselves from the protest.  A spokesperson for the group said "We have nothing to do with this protest. What we want is for Roderic O'Gorman and his department to sit down and consult with us to come to a positive outcome for both the communities within the barracks and visitors who come. This is the only way, we feel, for a positive outcome to be achieved, and we want a positive outcome. Negotiation is key and if that was done in the first place this protest wouldn’t be happening. As far as I'm aware no community groups within the barracks are involved in the protest. The situation has been manipulated and doubled in volume, leaving things in a dangerous place.”

Cootehill
On 18 February 2023, around 60 people demonstrated in Cootehill against what they called the government's housing of "illegal immigrants on an industrial scale". Organised by the Cavan Says No group, the protesters gathered at the former White Horse Hotel, chanting "Ireland is full". Those taking part spoke of their fears caused by rumours of "80-100 men of fighting age" coming to stay at the hotel. The protest was criticised by local community activist Ruairi McKiernan and migrant rights group Doras.https://northernstandard.ie/2023/02/25/cootehill-migrant-protest-was-fuelled-by-dangerous-misinformation-says-rights-group/

Reactions
Political response
On 12 January 2023, Taoiseach Leo Varadkar commented that while communities have the right to be consulted by the government about who is placed there, he stated "I don’t think any community can have a veto on who gets to live in their area. I think we need to be very careful not to make the mistake of confusing consultation and information with communities, which is important, with the idea that any community can have a veto on the kind of people who get to live in their area. That’s not right."

On 3 February 2023, Minster for Housing Darragh O'Brien commented that "First and foremost, what I saw in Finglas this week and what I have seen across the country with some of the protests has to be condemned outright. People have a right to protest and have their view, even if I don’t share their view. They don’t have a right to intimidate people. They don’t have a right to bully people. Some of the activity we have seen is reprehensible" before suggesting that a number of the protests had been "hijacked" by "far-right agitators" seeking to capitalise on local unrest.

On 5 February 2023, President Michael D. Higgins said in relation to the protests "What is unforgivable and must be opposed — publicly, vocally and unequivocally — are those who are trying to take advantage by sowing hate and building fear. We are in a position now where we have elements who are not interested in solving the long-standing problems within communities or the new arrivals. You mustn’t give them the opportunity. The best way of not giving them the opportunity is to fill the place with services. These people who are going around whipping people up and so forth, you didn’t see them previously making a case for housing, or for women’s rights, or for equal rights of any kind".

Polling
The anti-immigration movement claims to represent 90% of Irish people and that 90% of people polled disagree with the government's refugee policy.

On 29 January 2023, Red C/The Business Post published polling that included a number of questions relating to immigration:

On February 5, Ireland Thinks/The Sunday Independent published polling that included a number of questions relating to immigration:

Business response
On 4 February the Irish Times'' reported that internal memos amongst members of the government coalition warned that hoteliers were backing away from taking government contracts over fears that protests would take place outside their businesses.

"Ireland for All" Solidarity Rally

On 18 February, as many as 50,000 marchers rallied in Dublin and others in Sligo under the banner of "Ireland For All". The Dublin rally was organised by the newly founded organisation, "Le Chéile", which comprises almost 50 member organisations and which had called for a march in support of "diversity not division", and opposition to racism. Attendees at the Dublin rally included members and supporters of Sinn Féin, the Social Democrats, the Labour Party, and People Before Profit-Solidarity. Other organisations present included various trade unions such as Fórsa, SIPTU and the Teachers Union of Ireland; the Movement of Asylum Seekers in Ireland, Pavee Point and the National Women's Council of Ireland. Marchers were still passing the GPO as the front of the march reached Custom House Quay. When the march arrived at the Customs House, Christy Moore spoke and performed, and Bernadette McAliskey addressed the rally, saying "...the question that must be asked of the nation and of individuals is 'Whose side are you on?'" She said one side is the side of humanity, decency and human rights, and that the other side is "on the road to fascism."

External links 
 Joint committee debate on the "Refugee Accommodation Crisis" on 22 November 2022
 Ireland First
 Le Chéile

References 

Refugees in Ireland
Department of Children, Equality, Disability, Integration and Youth
Right of asylum in the Republic of Ireland
Immigration to the Republic of Ireland
Immigration-related protests
Protests in the Republic of Ireland
2022 in Ireland
2023 in Ireland
2022 protests
2023 protests
Humanitarian aid
Ukrainian refugees
Anti-immigration politics in Europe
Racism in Ireland
Protest marches
Demonstrations